Molecular Pharmacology is a peer-reviewed scientific journal published by the American Society for Pharmacology and Experimental Therapeutics since 1965. It is indexed in MEDLINE, Meta, Scopus, and other databases.

According to the Journal Citation Reports, the journal received a 2017 impact factor of 3.987.

History 
The journal was established by Avram Goldstein in 1965. , the editor-in-chief is Kathryn E. Meier, (Washington State University).

References

External links 
 

Pharmacology journals
Publications established in 1965
Monthly journals
English-language journals